In graph theory, a branch of mathematics, a half graph is a special type of bipartite graph. These graphs are called the half graphs because they have approximately half of the edges of a complete bipartite graph on the same vertices. The name was given to these graphs by Paul Erdős and András Hajnal.

Definition

The same concept can also be defined in the same way for infinite graphs over two copies of any ordered set of vertices.
The half graph over the natural numbers (with their usual ordering)
has the property that each vertex  has finite degree, at most . The vertices on the other side of the bipartition have infinite degree.

Properties

Matching
The half graph has a unique perfect matching. This is straightforward to see by induction:  must be matched to its only neighbor, and the remaining vertices form another half graph. More strongly, every bipartite graph with a unique perfect matching is a subgraph of a half graph.

In graphs of uncountable chromatic number
If the chromatic number of a graph is uncountable,
then the graph necessarily contains as a subgraph a half graph on the natural numbers. This half graph, in turn, contains every complete bipartite graph in which one side of the bipartition is finite and the other side is countably infinite.

Applications

Regularity
One application for the half graph occurs in the Szemerédi regularity lemma,
which states that the vertices of any graph can be partitioned into a constant number of subsets of equal size, such that most pairs of subsets are regular
(the edges connecting the pair behave in certain ways like a random graph of some particular density). Therefore, it is not possible to strengthen the regularity lemma to show the existence of a partition for which all pairs are regular. On the other hand, for any integer , the graphs that do not have a -vertex half graph as an induced subgraph obey a stronger version of the regularity lemma with no irregular pairs.

Stability
Saharon Shelah's unstable formula theorem in model theory characterizes the stable theories (complete theories that have few types) by the nonexistence of countably infinite half graphs. Intuitively, the existence of these half graphs allows one to construct infinite ordered sets within the model. The unstable formula theorem states that a complete theory is stable if and only if it does not have the order property.

References

Parametric families of graphs